Gazgazareh or Gaz Gezareh, also rendered as Gazgazar or Gaz Gazar or Gar Gezareh may refer to:
 Gazgazareh-ye Olya
 Gazgazareh-ye Sofla